Faches-Thumesnil is a commune in the Nord department in northern France.

It is a suburb south of Lille and forms part of the Métropole Européenne de Lille.

Population

Heraldry

Faches Thumesnil is twinned with the market town of St.Neots in Cambridgeshire, England, and with the town of Naousa, Greece.

See also
Communes of the Nord department

References

Fachesthumesnil
French Flanders